The Wedding Coach is a reality streaming television series starring Jamie Lee, Fortune Feimster and Jon Gabrusthat that aired on Netflix on April 7, 2021.

Cast 
 Jamie Lee
 Fortune Feimster
 Jon Gabrus

References

External links
 
 
 
 

2021 American television series debuts
2021 American television series endings
2020s American reality television series
English-language Netflix original programming